Ma Liang  (Chinese:马亮) born February 27, 1982, also known as Ma Yi (Chinese:马义), is a Chinese football player.

References

1982 births
Living people
Footballers from Shenyang
Chinese footballers
Guangzhou F.C. players
Changsha Ginde players
Jiangsu F.C. players
China League One players
Association football midfielders